Chief Oyin Adejobi  (1926–2000) was a Nigerian dramatist and actor. His name, Oyin, means "Honey". He wrote and performed in a variety of Yoruba productions on the stage, on television and in movies. He was married to actress Grace Oyin-Adejobi until his death.

He was especially well known for his autobiographical movie Orogun Adedigba. He also had a weekly television show, Kootu Asipa "Ashipa Court" on Nigerian Television Authority, Ibadan. The 'Oyin Adejobi Popular Theatre Company' is named after him.

Filmography 

Iya Olobi
Orogun Adedigba
Ile Iwosan
Kootu Asipa (Ashipa's Court)
Iyekan Soja
Ekuro Oloja
Kuye

References

Notes 
Barber, Karin and Ogundijo, Bayo (eds.). Yoruba Popular Theatre: Three Plays by the Oyin Adejobi Company, African Studies Association, 1995. 
Barber, Karin. The Generation of Plays: Yoruba Popular Life in Theater, Indiana University Press, 2003. 
Bodunrin, Hammed. "My 42 years onstage," Daily Sun, June 3, 2005 
Jeyifo, Biodun. The Yoruba popular travelling theatre of Nigeria, Lagos, Nigeria: Department of Culture, Federal Ministry of Social Development, Youth, Sports & Culture, 1984. ASIN B0006EK66S

External links 
Klub Afrik
Daily Sun

Nigerian dramatists and playwrights
1926 births
2000 deaths
Nigerian male film actors
Nigerian television personalities
Yoruba male actors
20th-century Nigerian male actors
Male actors in Yoruba cinema
Yoruba dramatists and playwrights
Yoruba-language writers
20th-century Nigerian dramatists and playwrights
Nigerian television presenters